Peperomia tetragona is a species of plant in the genus Peperomia native to South America. Its range is known to be from Ecuador, Peru, and Paraguay to central/western Brazil. Long grown as a houseplant in temperate climates, it is often known by its synonym Peperomia puteolata or as the parallel Peperomia for the parallel venation on its elliptical leaves.

References 

tetragona
Plants described in 1798